Benzene is an aromatic hydrocarbon.

Benzene or related words may also refer to:

 Benzene (data page)
 The homophones benzene and benzine are alternate names for gasoline in many countries
 Benzine can refer to petroleum ether
 "Benzin" is a song by Rammstein
 Benzene Convention, 1971
 Benzyne, the hydrocarbon 1,2-didehydrobenzene
 Benzene were an Israeli band featuring Yehuda Poliker